Bokbunjaju, also called bokbunja wine, is a Korean fruit wine made from wild and/or cultivated black raspberry; traditionally of the Korean species Bokbunja (Rubus coreanus), but nowadays mostly from Rubus occidentalis, which originates from Northern America and is now widely cultivated in Korea.

The beverage is produced in Gochang County, Jeollabuk-do, in Damyang, Jeollanam-do, and in Jeju Island, South Korea. It is made by fermenting berries with water. Some varieties also contain rice and reishi mushroom extract.

The wine is deep red in color and moderately sweet. The scent of ripe fruit rises, and the sour taste is low. The bitter taste left behind makes it go well with food. Soft tannins irritate the tongue. It ranges between 15% and 19% alcohol by volume, depending on the brand. It is believed to be healthful  and to promote male sexual stamina.

Since 2008, South Korean scientists have searched for ways to use bokbunja seeds, which are a by-product of bokbunja ju production. The carbonized seeds can be used as potential adsorbent for industrial dye removal from wastewaters.

References

Raspberry
Fruit wines
Korean alcoholic drinks
North Jeolla Province
Jeju Province